The Kraft Group, LLC, is a group of privately held companies in the professional sports, manufacturing, and real estate development industries doing business in 90 countries. Founded in 1998 by American businessman Robert Kraft as a holding company for various interests he had acquired since 1968, it is based in Foxborough, Massachusetts.

Corporate structure 
 Kraft Sports Group
New England Patriots, LP (founded in 1960, acquired by Kraft in 1994)
 New England Revolution, LP (founded by Kraft in 1995)
 Gillette Stadium, $325 million facility privately financed by Kraft (opened 2002)
 Patriot Place, $350 million "lifestyle and entertainment center" around Gillette Stadium (opened 2007–2008)
 TeamOps, LLC (founded in 2006)
 TeamOps (Event Staff)
 TeamOps Detect
 Boston Breach, a Call of Duty League team (founded in 2021)
 Boston Uprising, an Overwatch League team (founded in 2017)
 Kraft Analytics Group (KAGR)
 Rand-Whitney Group, LLC (founded in 1857, acquired by Kraft in 1968)
Previously owned by Jacob Hiatt, father of Kraft's wife Myra Kraft
Based in Worcester, Massachusetts, includes:
Rand-Whitney Container, LLP
Rand-Whitney Containerboard, LLP
Rand-Whitney Waste, LLP
 International Forest Products, LLC (founded by Kraft in 1972)
Operated by Robert Kraft's son Daniel Kraft
 More than 30 private equity investments
 Principal shareholdings
Carmel Container Systems, Ltd.
Based in Caesarea, Israel
American-Israeli Paper Mills, Ltd.
Based in Hadera, Israel
Ampal Enterprises, Ltd.
Based in Tel Aviv, Israel

References

External links
The Kraft Group
International Forest Products

Financial services companies established in 1998
American companies established in 1998
Holding companies of the United States
Manufacturing companies based in Massachusetts
Privately held companies based in Massachusetts
Real estate companies of the United States
New England Patriots owners
New England Revolution
Private equity firms of the United States
Foxborough, Massachusetts
Boston Uprising
Family-owned companies of the United States